Major General Paul Le Gay Brereton,  (born 27 August 1957) is a Judge of the New South Wales Court of Appeal and a senior officer in the Australian Army Reserve. He commanded the 5th Brigade from 2008 to 2010 and Head of the Cadet, Reserve and Employer Support Division from 2010 to 2014. He led an Inspector-General of the Australian Defence Force investigation into criminal misconduct on the battlefield by Australian Special forces in Afghanistan, issuing the Inspector-General of the Australian Defence Force Afghanistan Inquiry Report  in November 2020.

Early life
Paul Brereton was born 27 August 1957 in North Sydney, New South Wales. Brereton's father Russell Brereton (1911–1974), saw military service during the Second World War in the Middle East, New Guinea and Borneo and was later a permanent Puisne Judge of the Supreme Court of New South Wales. Paul Brereton was educated at Knox Grammar School and the University of Sydney. Brereton graduated with a Bachelor of Arts (Honours) in 1980 and Bachelor of Laws in 1982. That year, he was admitted as a solicitor in New South Wales and moved to Sydney, where he practised as an employed solicitor with Duncan Barron & Co until 1987. He joined the Sydney Bar and was appointed Senior Counsel in 1998. In 2005 he was sworn in as a Judge of the Supreme Court of New South Wales. He works primarily in the Equity Division.

Army Reserve
Brereton enlisted in the Australian Army Reserve in 1975 and was commissioned into the Royal Australian Infantry Corps in 1979. From 1977 until 1997 he was also Training Officer of the Knox Grammar School Cadet Unit. His senior appointments have included Second-in-command of Sydney University Regiment (1994–96), Commanding Officer of the 4th/3rd Battalion, Royal New South Wales Regiment (1997–99), and as an instructor at the Australian Command and Staff College (2000–01). He was subsequently Colonel, Reserve Policy (2003–04) and then Chief of Staff, 5th Brigade (2005–06), for which service he was awarded a Land Commander's commendation. On 1 January 2007 he was promoted brigadier and posted as Assistant Chief of Staff, Land Headquarters, and on 1 January 2008, assumed his posting as commander 5th Brigade. Brereton was promoted major general and served as Head of the Cadet, Reserve and Employer Support Division from 2010 to 2014.

Honours 

   

Brereton was appointed a Member of the Order of Australia in the 2010 Queen's Birthday Honours for his "exceptional service to the Australian Army".

References

1957 births
Australian generals
Judges of the Supreme Court of New South Wales
Living people
Members of the Order of Australia
People educated at Knox Grammar School
Sydney Law School alumni
Military personnel from New South Wales